Leonard Houghton Geoffrey Martin (19 April 1887 – 26 December 1943) was an Australian rules footballer who played with Geelong in the Victorian Football League (VFL).

Notes

External links 
		

1887 births
1943 deaths
Australian rules footballers from Victoria (Australia)
Geelong Football Club players
Richmond Football Club (VFA) players